The Commission for Higher Education, is an agency of the Government of Kenya, regulated by the Commission for University Act No. 42 of 2012 established by the Kenyan Parliament, that is mandated to plan, monitor, regulate, modify, improve and communicate policy to stakeholders, regarding university education in Kenya.

Location
The headquarters of the Commission for University Education, are located at Red Hill Road, (off Limuru Road), in the Gigiri neighborhood of Nairobi, the capital city of Kenya. The geographical coordinates of the agency's headquarters are 1°13'35.0"S, 36°47'55.0"E (Latitude:-1.226389; Longitude:36.798611).

History
CUE is governed by the Commission for University Act No. 42 of 2012, as amended.

Overview
CUE's main role is to license new universities and other institutions of higher learning in Kenya. Accreditation may be provisional or permanent, and is revocable at the sole discretion of CUE. The agency is also responsible for monitoring the performance of the institutions that it licenses, to ensure that they maintain the standards, if satisfactory, and remedy those aspects, where improvement is needed. The commission is governed by a five-person Commission Board, chaired by the Commission Secretary, who also serves as the chief executive officer of the government agency.

See also
 Education in Kenya

References

External links
Website of Commission for University Education

Regulatory agencies of Kenya
Higher education in Kenya
Organizations established in 1985
Nairobi
1985 establishments in Kenya
Higher education authorities